The Lord Provost of Dundee is the chair and civic head of the City of Dundee local authority in Scotland. They are elected by the city council and serve not only as the chair of that body, but as a figurehead and Lord Lieutenant for the city. They are equivalent in many ways to the institution of Mayor that exists in other countries.

Each of the 32 Scottish local authorities elects a Provost, but it is only the four largest cities, Glasgow, Edinburgh, Aberdeen and Dundee that have a Lord Provost. This is enshrined in the Local Government etc. (Scotland) Act 1994.

The Mediaeval burgh of Dundee was administered by officials known as "Bailies", Provosts and the office of "Constable of Dundee". The office of Provost as the single chief official of the burgh was not created until the 1480s.

List of provosts and lord provosts

Provosts

15th century

16th century

17th century

18th century

19th century

Lord Provosts

Deputy lieutenants
A deputy lieutenant of Dundee is commissioned by the Lord Lieutenant of Dundee. Deputy lieutenants support the work of the lord-lieutenant. There can be several deputy lieutenants at any time, depending on the population of the county. Their appointment does not terminate with the changing of the lord-lieutenant, but they usually retire at age 75.

19th Century
9 November 1894: The Rt. Hon. The Earl of Strathmore and Kinghorne
9 November 1894: The Rt. Hon. The Earl of Camperdown
9 November 1894: Colonel Sir Reginald Ogilvy, 
9 November 1894: Sir John Leng
9 November 1894: Sir Thomas Thornton
9 November 1894: Edmund Robertson, 
9 November 1894: William Robertson, Esq.
9 November 1894: Alexander Hay Moncur, Esq.
9 November 1894: William Hunter, Esq.
9 November 1894: Hugh Ballingall, Esq.
9 November 1894: Alexander MathewsoD, Esq.
9 November 1894: William Brownlee, Esq.
9 November 1894: James Erskine Erskine, Esq.
9 November 1894: Duncan Macdonald, Esq.
9 November 1894: John Sharp, Esq.
9 November 1894: Sir James Low, 
9 November 1894: George Addison Cox, Esq.
9 November 1894: George W. Baxter, Esq.
9 November 1894: Henry M'Grady, Esq.

Notes

References

Lord Provosts of Dundee
Dundee, Lord Provosts of
Lord Provosts